Woxsen University  (Established as Woxsen School of Business in 2014) received its status as a State Private University in the year 2020 and is one of the first private universities of the state of Telangana, India. Woxsen is amongst the leading educational institutes in India, spanning over 200-acre residential campus and consists of constituent schools such as School of Business, School of Technology, School of Art & Design, School of Liberal Arts and Humanities & School of Architecture and Planning

Campus

The 200 acre fully-residential campus of Woxsen University is located at Sadashivapet, about 60kms from the city of Hyderabad, Telangana.

Academic programs

Graduate programs
B.Tech, BBA, B.Com(Hons.), B.Des(Hons.), B.Arch, BA(Hons.), BA-LLB(Hons.), BBA-LLB(Hons.)

Post-Graduate Programs
MBA (General), MBA (Financial services), MBA (Business analytics)

Doctoral programs
Ph.D. in Business Management, Engineering & Technology, Design

Research

Centre of Excellence (CoE)

Woxsen University’s Centre of Excellence (CoE) has been established to act as a one-stop resource centre, for research and development in specialised areas and emerging technology.  

Woxsen University has established CoE with two of its global partner universities HHL Leipzig Graduate School of Management, Germany for Entrepreneurship & Business Development and with Faculty of Electrical Engineering, Computer Science & Technology under the Josip Juraj Strossmayer University of Osijek, Croatia for Artificial Intelligence & Robotics.

Besides conducting Research and Development in related fields, both Woxsen & its global partner universities will leverage Woxsen’s CoE to foster relations across countries, between governments, workers, chambers of commerce, academia and the industry, establishing collaborations on various projects in the focused areas. The initiatives will also provide a strong platform for meritorious students and scholars of both the institutions to ideate and facilitate innovative output in the respective fields.

Honorary Chairs
Woxsen University has set up a number of honorary chairs in a variety of management domains. Examples are the Amitava Chattopadhyay Chair of Consumer Insights and Innovation, the Cary Cooper Chair of Organizational Psychology, the Vijay Govindarajan Chair of Strategy and Innovation, the Andreas Kaplan Chair of Responsible Research, the Steven Pinker Chair of Cognitive Psychology, the Mohanbir Sawhney Chair of Digital Marketing, and the Valarie Zeithaml Chair of Services Marketing.

Social Impact
In 2022, Woxsen collaborated with Monmouth University to support the United Nations Sustainable Development Goals. Known as the Woxsen-Monmouth Elevate Program, it is run by student volunteers from both universities. The program began with 200+ children from 10 regions of the Telangana State. It helps underprivileged students of Telangana by providing economic and academic aid, infrastructure support, recorded lectures, supplies, and sports equipment.
 
In 2021, students of Woxsen addressed women and girl students at Devuni Narmetta, a model village. Forty student volunteers from Woxsen University addressed issues in women's healthcare, fitness and career growth. They also presented ways to promote local artisans to promote economic growth and standard of living.

Rankings
 Ranked 1st in Emerging BBA colleges in India by Outlook
 Ranked 1st in Emerging Engineering colleges in India by Outlook
 Ranked 2nd All India Top Private Design School by IIRF, Education Post 
 Ranked 11th All India Top B-School by IIRF, Education Post
 Ranked 13th All India Top 150 B-schools in India
 Ranked 16th among All India Private B-Schools by Business World 
 Ranked Top 25th B-School by ASIA Inc.

Student Life
Woxsen University is leaned towards facilitating both professional and personal growth of students through wide range of Student Clubs, Sports Arena and Cultural Events.

References

Universities in Telangana
Private universities in India
2020 establishments in Telangana
Educational institutions established in 2020